Libythea tsiandava is a butterfly in the family Nymphalidae. It is found in Madagascar. The habitat consists of deciduous and humid lowland forests.

References

Butterflies described in 1891
Libythea
Butterflies of Africa